Ivaski is a village in Põhja-Sakala Parish, Viljandi County, Estonia. It has a population of 74 (as of 2009).

The first Estonian professional painter Johann Köler (1826–1899) was born in Lubjassaare farm in Ivaski.

References

Villages in Viljandi County